Stroh Austria GmbH is an Austrian manufacturer of rum, especially spiced rums and high-proof rums used in warm drinks and cooking. The Stroh Rum brand is one of the best-known spirits from Austria.  The name is widely used as a generic synonym for spirits with a similarly high alcohol content in Germanic speaking regions. The company is privately held by Austrian owners.

History
With roots starting in 1832, Stroh began large-scale liqueur and brandy manufacturing in Klagenfurt in 1857. The company was named after its founder, Boštijan Stroh, who started the beginnings of the small business in St. Paul (Carinthian Lavanttal). His widow, Maria Stroh, continued the business with production facilities at Karfreitstrasse 18 in Klagenfurt.

Located in the land-locked Austria-Hungary region, the company had no direct access to colonies in tropical regions with rum or easy access to rum importation. To make a rum-like product, the production at the time replaced the sugarcane molasses aroma with a mixture of flavorants and coloring added to alcohol from sugar beets, which came to be known as Inländer-Rum ("domestic rum"). This historic substitute created a distinctive product that smelled primarily of butterscotch and vanilla. It became a regional specialty and favorite, later being awarded a gold medal at the 1900 Exposition Universelle in Paris.

Today Austrian rum is a true rum made from sugarcane by-products according to European Community regulations, while the typical Inländer flavor is provided by traditional essences. A product designation for Inländer rum is not standardised by the Codex Alimentarius Austriacus.

Product line

The company is best known for its flagship product, Stroh Rum, and its bottled hunter's punch Jagertee, which is typically drunk warm and is served at ski resorts. Stroh has also made other packaged liquor products that are mostly available only in Europe, including Stroh Punsch, Stroh Cream, Stroh Fire and Stroh Cola.

In the United States Stroh Rum is known for its very high alcohol content, with the version most readily available there being 160 proof and frequently labeled as Stroh 160 (labeled as Stroh 80 in Europe). In Europe it is available in its full five variants: Stroh 38, Stroh 40, Stroh 54, Stroh 60 and Stroh 80 (representing alcohol by volume and corresponding to 76, 80, 108, 120 and 160 proof (US) respectively).

Stroh products are internationally sold and are available in more than 40 countries.

Product use
Exports to Germany, Scandinavia, and Benelux account for about two-thirds of the company's sales.

The overproof rum product versions are seldom drunk neat and are more commonly used in cooking or for mixing in homemade Jagertee or other warm punches (including in Feuerzangenbowle, or mixed with hot tea, honey, and butter). Because of its flammability it is used for lighting drinks on fire, such as the Flaming B-52, or in strong cocktails such as the Von Tiki. A lower proof product version is packaged and sold in small syrup containers for use in soaking waffles.

Stroh is a common household and commercially important ingredient in the making of syrups, cake frostings, pastries, and other desserts in Austrian cuisine due to its sweet flavor and strong butterscotch and vanilla aromatic notes. An example is in preparation of rumtopf, a fruit based compote, and rum prune cake. It is also an ingredient in Bananas Foster variations, although less of the alcohol should be used.

The company has licensed the name for the spirit to be used by Walter Heindl GmbH in confectionary products such as Stroh Pralinen and Stroh flavored chocolate balls.

Product packaging

Stroh rum is packaged in brown glass bottles meant to emulate the hip flasks worn by hunters and others in the countryside during winter. Playing to its historic roots, some products are also packaged in larger jugs employing swing-top rubber stoppers. Other variations include Stroh in syrup containers, mini-bottles, and cans.

See also
 Jägertee
 Tuzemák

References

External links

 

Austrian brands
Companies established in 1832
Drink companies of Austria
Economy of Carinthia (state)
Klagenfurt
Rums